In mathematics, particularly in functional analysis, a  projection-valued measure (PVM) is a function defined on certain subsets of a fixed set and whose values are self-adjoint projections on a fixed Hilbert space. Projection-valued measures are formally similar to real-valued measures, except that their values are self-adjoint projections rather than real numbers. As in the case of ordinary measures, it is possible to integrate complex-valued functions with respect to a PVM; the result of such an integration is a linear operator on the given Hilbert space.

Projection-valued measures are used to express results in spectral theory, such as the important spectral theorem for self-adjoint operators. The Borel functional calculus for self-adjoint operators is constructed using integrals with respect to PVMs.  In quantum mechanics, PVMs are the mathematical description of projective measurements.  They are generalized by positive operator valued measures (POVMs) in the same sense that a mixed state or density matrix generalizes the notion of a pure state.

Formal definition 

A projection-valued measure  on a measurable space 

 

(where  is the identity operator of ) and for every , the following function 

We denote this measure by 
.

Note that  is a real-valued measure, and a probability measure when  has length one.

If  is a projection-valued measure and

 

then the images ,  are orthogonal to each other.  From this follows that in general,

 

and they commute.

Example. Suppose  is a measure space.

be the operator of multiplication by the indicator function  on L2(X). Then  is a projection-valued measure.

Extensions of projection-valued measures, integrals and the spectral theorem

If  is a projection-valued measure on a measurable space (X, M), then the map

 

extends to a linear map on the vector space of step functions on X.  In fact, it is easy to check that this map is a ring homomorphism.  This map extends in a canonical way to all bounded complex-valued measurable functions on X, and we have the following.

Theorem. For any bounded M-measurable function f on X, there exists a unique bounded linear operator 

The map

 

is a homomorphism of rings. 

 

The theorem is also correct for unbounded measurable functions f, but then  will be an unbounded linear operator on the Hilbert space H.

The spectral theorem says that every self-adjoint operator  has an associated projection-valued measure  defined on the real axis, such that

This allows to define the Borel functional calculus for such operators: if  is a measurable function, we set

 Structure of projection-valued measures

First we provide a general example of projection-valued measure based on direct integrals.   Suppose (X, M, μ) is a measure space and let {Hx}x ∈ X  be a μ-measurable family of separable Hilbert spaces. For every  E ∈ M, let (E) be the operator of multiplication by 1E on the Hilbert space

Then  is a projection-valued measure on (X, M).

for every E ∈ M.

Theorem. If (X, M) is a standard Borel space, then for every projection-valued measure  on (X, M) taking values in the projections of a separable Hilbert space, there is a Borel measure μ and a μ-measurable family of Hilbert spaces {Hx}x ∈ X , such that  is unitarily equivalent to multiplication by 1E on the Hilbert space

The measure class of μ and the measure equivalence class of the multiplicity function x → dim Hx completely characterize the projection-valued measure up to unitary equivalence.

A projection-valued measure  is homogeneous of multiplicity n if and only if the multiplicity function has constant value n.  Clearly,

Theorem.  Any projection-valued measure  taking values in the projections of a separable Hilbert space is an orthogonal direct sum of homogeneous projection-valued measures:

where

and

Application in quantum mechanics

In quantum mechanics, given a projection valued measure of a measurable space X to the space of continuous endomorphisms upon a Hilbert space H,

 the projective space of the Hilbert space H is interpreted as the set of possible states Φ of a quantum system,
 the measurable space X is the value space for some quantum property of the system (an "observable"), 
 the projection-valued measure  expresses the probability that the observable takes on various values.

A common choice for X is the real line, but it may also be 

 R3 (for position or momentum in three dimensions ), 
 a discrete set (for angular momentum, energy of a bound state, etc.), 
 the 2-point set "true" and "false" for the truth-value of an arbitrary proposition about Φ.

Let E be a measurable subset of the measurable space X and Φ a normalized vector-state in H, so that its Hilbert norm is unitary, ||Φ|| = 1. The probability that the observable takes its value in the subset E, given the system in state Φ, is

where the latter notation is preferred in physics.

We can parse this in two ways. 

First, for each fixed E, the projection (E) is a self-adjoint operator on H whose 1-eigenspace is the states Φ for which the value of the observable always lies in E, and whose 0-eigenspace is the states Φ for which the value of the observable never lies in E.  

Second, for each fixed normalized vector state , the association 

is a probability measure on X making the values of the observable into a random variable.

A measurement that can be performed by a projection-valued measure  is called a projective measurement. 

which takes the more readable form

The above operator A is called the observable associated with the spectral measure.

Any operator so obtained is called an observable, in quantum mechanics.

Generalizations
The idea of a projection-valued measure is generalized by the positive operator-valued measure (POVM), where the need for the orthogonality implied by projection operators is replaced by the idea of a set of operators that are a non-orthogonal partition of unity. This generalization is motivated by applications to quantum information theory.

 See also 
 Spectral theorem
 Spectral theory of compact operators
 Spectral theory of normal C*-algebras

References

 
 
 Mackey, G. W., The Theory of Unitary Group Representations, The University of Chicago Press, 1976
 M. Reed and B. Simon, Methods of Mathematical Physics, vols I–IV, Academic Press 1972.
  
  
 G. Teschl, Mathematical Methods in Quantum Mechanics with Applications to Schrödinger Operators, https://www.mat.univie.ac.at/~gerald/ftp/book-schroe/, American Mathematical Society, 2009.
  
 Varadarajan, V. S., Geometry of Quantum Theory'' V2, Springer Verlag, 1970.

Linear algebra
Measures (measure theory)
Spectral theory